Cotton is an unincorporated community in Cotton Township, Saint Louis County, Minnesota, United States.

Cotton is located 27 miles south of the city of Virginia.

Cotton is generally considered the half way point between the cities of Duluth and Virginia.

The Whiteface River flows through the community.

Climate
The Köppen Climate Classification subtype for this climate is "Dfb" (Warm Summer Continental Climate). Cotton's weather is noteworthy for having the lowest recorded temperature in the lower 48 states in the last ten years, on January 31, 2019.

See also
Cotton School

References

 Rand McNally Road Atlas – 2007 edition – Minnesota entry
 Official State of Minnesota Highway Map – 2011/2012 edition

Unincorporated communities in Minnesota
Unincorporated communities in St. Louis County, Minnesota